Torodora manoconta is a species of moth in the family Lecithoceridae. It is found in Taiwan and the provinces of Jiangxi and Yunnan in China.

The wingspan is 19–22 mm. The forewings are elongate and slightly wider towards the termen. The colour is greyish brown throughout, without a pattern. There is a faint discal spot at the end of the cell. The hindwings are grey.

References

Torodora
Moths of Asia
Moths of Taiwan
Moths described in 1994